Flavien Khoury also Flavien Kfoury (1859 in Khounshara, Lebanon – 1920) was Archbishop of the Melkite Greek Catholic Archeparchy of Homs in Syria.

Life

On November 21, 1901, Khoury became the successor of Gregory Ata and was appointed Archbishop of Homs. He was co-consecrator of the Melkite Patriarch Maximos IV Sayegh. In 1920, he became, at the same time appointed Titular Archbishop of Palmyra of Greek Melkites, retired archbishop and died in the same year. He was succeeded by Basilio Khouri.

References

External links

 http://www.catholic-hierarchy.org/bishop/bkfour.html
 https://web.archive.org/web/20120419194326/http://www.pgc-lb.org/english/Church3.shtml#Homs

1859 births
1920 deaths
Lebanese Melkite Greek Catholics
Melkite Greek Catholic bishops
Eastern Catholic bishops in Syria